SpaceAble is a French startup specialising in Space Situational Awareness services, founded in 2018 by Julien Cantegreil.

In 2021, AXA XL selected SpaceAble as a partner to help it insure space operators and other space players.

References 

Space debris
Near-Earth object tracking
Astronomical surveys
French companies established in 2018
Space industry companies